Oshdalaq-e Sofla (also Romanized as Oshdalaq-e Soflá; also known as Ashdalaq-e Pā'īn, Old Ushtulia, Oshtelaghé Sofla, Oshtelaq-e Pā’īn, Oshtolaq-e Soflá, Oshtolaq Pā’īn, Oshtoq-e Soflá, Ūshdelī-ye Kohneh, Ūshdelī-ye Pā’īn, Ushtulia, and Ushtulya) is a village in Mehranrud-e Markazi Rural District, in the Central District of Bostanabad County, East Azerbaijan Province, Iran. At the 2006 census, its population was 703, in 180 families.

References 

Populated places in Bostanabad County